Martin Francis Gritton (born 1 June 1978) is a Scottish former professional footballer and sports co-commentator primarily for BBC Radio Devon.

As a player he was a striker from 1998 to 2012. He was a journeyman player and has previously played for Plymouth Argyle, Shelbourne, Torquay United, Grimsby Town, Lincoln City, Mansfield Town, Macclesfield Town, Chesterfield, Chester, Yeovil Town, Stockport County and Truro City

Career
Although born in Glasgow, Gritton moved to South-West England at an early age and played for Cornish non-league sides Perranwell, Truro City, and Porthleven while studying at the University of Portsmouth helping the latter reach the quarter-finals of the FA Vase in 1998. He impressed Plymouth Argyle manager Kevin Hodges in a trial in the summer of 1998 and joined the Pilgrims initially on a non-contract deal to allow him to complete his degree. His league debut came as a substitute on 8 August 1998 in Plymouth's 2–1 home win against Rochdale. Although doing enough to earn himself a full-time deal at Home Park, he never fully established himself in the starting line-up and was allowed out on loan, to Yeovil Town in February 2001 and to Irish side Shelbourne in November 2001.

In August 2002, after playing only twice in Plymouth's 2001–02 promotion side, he joined Torquay United on loan, signing permanently on a free transfer the following month. He settled in well at Plainmoor scoring 16 times in his first season and helping the Gulls to automatic promotion the following season. With Torquay struggling in the higher division and looking to cut costs he was allowed to move to Grimsby Town in December 2004 for a nominal fee .

Although linked with a welcome return to Torquay United, he joined Lincoln City on 30 January 2006. The timing of this move meant that he played against Torquay United in two consecutive games. He was mostly used as a substitute in the 2006–07 season due to the form of Jamie Forrester.
In January 2007 he joined Mansfield Town on loan for the remainder of the 2006–07 season. On 30 January 2007, he scored a hat-trick against his former club Torquay. He was released on a free transfer the following May, joining Macclesfield a few weeks later.

On 8 January 2009, Chesterfield purchased Gritton from Macclesfield Town for a fee of £40,000 on a 2 and a half-year deal. He re-joined former club Torquay on loan for the start of the 2010–11 season. He returned to Chesterfield in January 2011 and had his contract cancelled by mutual consent.

He then joined Chester F.C., and on 22 March 2011 signed on a short-term contract with Yeovil Town until the end of the 2010–11 season. He was informed by the club at the end of the season that he would not be awarded a new deal.

In June 2011 he signed a one-year contract with Stockport County. He played eleven games for the club before being released in March 2012. He subsequently joined Truro City on a non-contract basis, scoring his first goal in a 3–0 win against Thurrock.

Personal life
After leaving Truro, Gritton retired from football and moved to London.

Gritton has worked as a co-commentator for BBC Radio Devon's coverage of Plymouth Argyle and Torquay United games. He has also occasionally appeared for BBC Radio Humberside covering Grimsby Town matches.

His brother, Kevin, was the drummer in the 1990s indie band Adorable who were signed to Creation Records and released two albums. Martin was the band's roadie on their 2019 reunion tour.

References

External links

1978 births
Living people
Footballers from Glasgow
Scottish footballers
Association football forwards
Plymouth Argyle F.C. players
Yeovil Town F.C. players
Shelbourne F.C. players
Grimsby Town F.C. players
Torquay United F.C. players
Lincoln City F.C. players
Mansfield Town F.C. players
Macclesfield Town F.C. players
Chesterfield F.C. players
Chester F.C. players
Stockport County F.C. players
Truro City F.C. players
English Football League players
League of Ireland players
National League (English football) players
Alumni of the University of Portsmouth
Anglo-Scots
Expatriate association footballers in the Republic of Ireland